All Royal Malaysian Navy ship carries the prefix KD (Malay : Kapal Di-Raja, literally "Royal Ship"), which is equivalent to "His Majesty's Ship" in English. The sailing ship however, carries the KLD prefix (Kapal Layar Di-Raja) to mean "His Majesty's Sailing Ship". Some of the historical ship also carries prefix HMS (His Majesty's Ship) in the early formation of the navy.

Ships

Aircraft

References

Equipment of the Royal Malaysian Navy
Royal Malaysian Navy